Yocón is a municipality in the west of the Honduran department of Olancho, north of Guayape, south of Mangulile and west of El Rosario.

Demographics
At the time of the 2013 Honduras census, Yocón municipality had a population of 11,812. Of these, 99.24% were Mestizo, 0.45% Indigenous, 0.20% Black or Afro-Honduran and 0.11% White.

References

Municipalities of the Olancho Department